Mendez may refer to:
Mendez (surname)
Mendez (horse)
Méndez Municipality, Tamaulipas, Mexico
Mendez, Cavite, Philippines
Mendez XXVI one of the main characters from the film Beneath the Planet of the Apes
Benveniste/Mendes family were prominent in 11th to 15th century France, Portugal and Spain.

See also
Mendes (disambiguation)